The M118 is a four-stroke inline-four engine produced from 1965 to 1972.

Design 
The M118 was originally developed by Mercedes-Benz for the mass-produced vehicle segment. It was first used by Audi in the F103, after Daimler AG sold the company to Volkswagen. The engine replaced the previous two-stroke engines, featured a Solex carburetor, and utilised a swirling effect in the intake ducts that allowed for smoother operation and enhanced efficiency. It was later revised several times with increased displacements and reduced compression ratios for improved reliability. The success of the M118 allowed Audi to expand into more upscale market segments.

Engines

M118 
40 kW version

 1968–1972 Audi 60

53 kW version
 1965–1968 Audi 72

55 kW version
 1968–1972 Audi 75

59 kW version
 1966–1968 Audi 80

66 kW version
 1966–1971 Audi 90

References 

Mercedes-Benz engines
Straight-four engines
Gasoline engines by model